Betta  is a large genus of small, active, often colorful, freshwater ray-finned fishes, in the gourami family (Osphronemidae). The best known Betta species is B. splendens, commonly known as the Siamese fighting fish and often kept as an aquarium pet.

Characteristics
All Betta species are small fishes, but they vary considerably in size, ranging from under 2.5 cm (1 in) total length in B. chanoides to 14 cm (5.5 in) in the Akar betta (B. akarensis).

Bettas are anabantoids, which means they can breathe atmospheric air using a unique organ called the labyrinth. This accounts for their ability to thrive in low-oxygen water conditions that would kill most other fish, such as rice paddies, slow-moving streams, drainage ditches, and large puddles.

The bettas exhibit two kinds of spawning behaviour: some build bubble nests, such as B. splendens, while others are mouthbrooders, such as B. picta. The mouthbrooding species are sometimes called "pseudo bettas", and are sometimes speculated to have evolved from the nest-builders in an adaptation to their fast-moving stream habitats.

A phylogenetic study published in 2004 concluded tentatively that bubble-nesting was the ancestral condition in Betta, and that mouthbrooding has evolved on more than one occasion in the history of the genus. However it was unable to establish a correlation with any of three habitat variables studied:  whether a species was found in lowland or highland streams, whether it was found in peat swamp forests, and whether it was found in water with fast or slow currents. Mouthbrooding species tend to exhibit less sexual dimorphism, perhaps because they do not need to defend a territory as the bubble-nesters do.

Name

Siamese fighting fish (B. splendens) are frequently sold in the United States simply as "bettas". In fact, around 73 species are classified within the genus Betta. A useful distinction is that while the generic name Betta is italicized and capitalized, when used as a common name it is usually neither italicized nor capitalized.
The common name of B. pugnax, for example, is thus Penang betta.

The name Betta (or betta) is pronounced ; the first part is the same as the English word bet. The name is often pronounced  in American English, and may be spelled with one 't'. The name of the genus is derived from the Malay word ikan betah ("persistent fish").

The vernacular name "plakat", often applied to the short-finned ornamental strains, derived from pla kad which means "fighting fish", is the Thai name for all members of the B. splendens species complex (All have aggressive tendencies in the wild and all are extensively line-bred for aggression in eastern Thailand). The Thai phrase is not restricted to one specific strain. The term "fighting fish" is generalized to all members of the B. splendens species complex, including the Siamese fighting fish.

Diet
Wild Betta fish are hardy and eat almost any animal small enough for these small fish to consume, including worms, larvae of mosquitoes or other insects, and smaller fish.  Their natural environment is often resource-limited, so many Betta species are generalist feeders.

Bettas as pets 
Bettas are commonly kept as pet fish, especially Siamese fighting fish. Bettas are popular fish due to their color variety and ease to care for, although the males must be kept separated from other bettas.

Conservation
While many Betta species are common and B. splendens is ubiquitous in the aquarium trade, other bettas are threatened. The IUCN Red List classifies several Betta species as Vulnerable. In addition, B. livida is Endangered, and B. miniopinna, B. persephone, and B. spilotogena are Critically Endangered.

The United Nations Environment Programme lists an unconfirmed species, Betta cf. tomi, as having become extinct in Singapore between 1970 and 1994.
This likely refers to the extirpated Singaporean population of B. tomi, which continues to exist in the wild in Indonesia and Malaysia, as well as in captivity; the Red List classifies it as Vulnerable.

Species

There are currently 75 recognized species in this genus.  The currently described Betta species can be grouped into species complexes:

 B. akarensis complex:
 Betta akarensis Regan, 1910 (Akar betta)
 Betta antoni H. H. Tan & P. K. L. Ng, 2006
 Betta aurigans H. H. Tan & K. K. P. Lim, 2004
 Betta balunga Herre, 1940
 Betta chini P. K. L. Ng, 1993
 Betta ibanorum H. H. Tan & P. K. L. Ng, 2004
 Betta nuluhon N. S. S. Kamal, H. H. Tan & Casey K. C. Ng, 2020
 Betta obscura H. H. Tan & P. K. L. Ng, 2005
 Betta pinguis H. H. Tan & Kottelat, 1998
 B. albimarginata complex:
 Betta albimarginata Kottelat & P. K. L. Ng, 1994
 Betta channoides Kottelat & P. K. L. Ng, 1994
 B. anabatoides complex:
 Betta anabatoides Bleeker, 1851 (giant betta)
 Betta midas H. H. Tan, 2009
 B. bellica complex:
 Betta bellica Sauvage, 1884 (slim betta)
 Betta simorum H. H. Tan & P. K. L. Ng, 1996
 B. coccina complex:
 Betta brownorum K. E. Witte & J. Schmidt, 1992
 Betta burdigala Kottelat & P. K. L. Ng, 1994
 Betta coccina Vierke, 1979
 Betta hendra I. Schindler & Linke, 2013
 Betta livida P. K. L. Ng & Kottelat, 1992
 Betta miniopinna H. H. Tan & S. H. Tan, 1994
 Betta persephone Schaller, 1986
 Betta rutilans K. E. Witte & Kottelat, 1991
 Betta tussyae Schaller, 1985
 Betta uberis H. H. Tan & P. K. L. Ng, 2006
 B. dimidiata complex:
 Betta dimidiata T. R. Roberts, 1989
 Betta krataios H. H. Tan & P. K. L. Ng, 2006
 B. edithae complex:
 Betta edithae Vierke, 1984
 B. foerschi complex:
 Betta dennisyongi H. H. Tan, 2013
 Betta foerschi Vierke, 1979
 Betta mandor H. H. Tan & P. K. L. Ng, 2006
 Betta rubra Perugia, 1893 (Toba betta)
 Betta strohi Schaller & Kottelat, 1989
 B. picta complex:
 Betta falx H. H. Tan & Kottelat, 1998
 Betta picta (Valenciennes, 1846) (spotted betta)
 Betta simplex Kottelat, 1994
 Betta taeniata Regan, 1910 (Borneo betta)
 B. pugnax complex:
 Betta apollon I. Schindler & J. Schmidt, 2006
 Betta breviobesa H. H. Tan & Kottelat, 1998
 Betta cracens H. H. Tan & P. K. L. Ng, 2005
 Betta enisae Kottelat, 1995
 Betta ferox I. Schindler & J. Schmidt, 2006
 Betta fusca Regan, 1910 (dusky betta)
 Betta kuehnei I. Schindler & J. Schmidt, 2008
 Betta lehi H. H. Tan & P. K. L. Ng, 2005
 Betta pallida I. Schindler & J. Schmidt, 2004
 Betta prima Kottelat, 1994
 Betta pugnax (Cantor, 1849) (Penang betta)
 Betta pulchra H. H. Tan & S. H. Tan, 1996
 Betta raja H. H. Tan & P. K. L. Ng, 2005
 Betta schalleri Kottelat & P. K. L. Ng, 1994
 Betta stigmosa H. H. Tan & P. K. L. Ng, 2005
 B. splendens complex (fighting fish):
 Betta imbellis Ladiges, 1975 (crescent betta)
 Betta mahachaiensis Kowasupat, Panijpan, Ruenwongsa & Sriwattanarothai, 2012
 Betta siamorientalis Kowasupat, Panijpan, Ruenwongsa & Jeenthong, 2012
 Betta smaragdina Ladiges, 1972 (Blue betta)
 Betta splendens Regan, 1910 (Siamese fighting fish)
 Betta stiktos H. H. Tan & P. K. L. Ng, 2005
 B. unimaculata complex:
 Betta compuncta H. H. Tan & P. K. L. Ng, 2006
 Betta gladiator H. H. Tan & P. K. L. Ng, 2005
 Betta ideii H. H. Tan & P. K. L. Ng, 2006
 Betta macrostoma Regan, 1910 (spotfin betta)
 Betta ocellata de Beaufort, 1933
 Betta pallifina H. H. Tan & P. K. L. Ng, 2005
 Betta patoti M. C. W. Weber & de Beaufort, 1922
 Betta unimaculata (Popta, 1905) (Howong betta)
 B. waseri complex:
 Betta chloropharynx Kottelat & P. K. L. Ng, 1994
 Betta hipposideros P. K. L. Ng & Kottelat, 1994
 Betta omega H. H. Tan & Ahmad, 2018
 Betta pardalotos H. H. Tan, 2009
 Betta pi H. H. Tan, 1998
 Betta renata H. H. Tan, 1998
 Betta spilotogena P. K. L. Ng & Kottelat, 1994
 Betta tomi P. K. L. Ng & Kottelat, 1994
 Betta waseri Krummenacher, 1986

References

External links

 
 The Aquarium Wiki category on Betta care information for sub varieties

 
Macropodusinae
Fauna of Southeast Asia
Fish of Thailand
Freshwater fish genera
Taxa named by Pieter Bleeker